Cryptoblabes adoceta, the sorghum head moth, is a species of snout moth in the genus Cryptoblabes. It was described by Turner in 1904. It is found in the Northern Territory and Queensland in Australia.

The wingspan is about 15 mm.

The larvae feed on Sorghum bicolor. They feed from within the seed heads of their host plant.

References

Moths described in 1904
Cryptoblabini